Kibbeling is a Dutch snack consisting of battered chunks of fish, commonly served with a mayonnaise-based garlic sauce or tartar sauce. In the nineteenth century, it denoted the salted waste (the cheeks) of the cod fish, which was an important part of the popular diet. It is a popular dish in the Netherlands.

See also
 Fish and chips
 List of deep fried foods
 List of fish dishes

References

Deep fried foods
Dutch cuisine
Fish dishes
Fishing in the Netherlands